Scamaphis is a genus of mites in the family Eviphididae. There is at least one described species in Scamaphis, S. equestris.

References

Mesostigmata
Articles created by Qbugbot